Nepalese revolution may refer to:
 1951 Nepalese revolution
 1990 Nepalese revolution
 Nepalese Civil War fought from 1996 to 2006
 2006 Nepalese revolution

See also
 Nepal Bhasa renaissance

History of Nepal